The Metro Atlantic Athletic Conference (MAAC) gave out several conference awards to ice hockey players and coaches while it operated a hockey conference from 1998-99 thru 2002-03. For five seasons the MAAC named players to three all-conference teams (First Team, Second Team and Rookie Team) and bestowed six of seven individual awards at the conclusion of the regular season. The seventh award (Tournament MVP) was conferred after the conference tournament was completed. All Awards were voted for by the head coaches of each MAAC member team.

All Awards were discontinued after the conclusion of the 2002-03 season when the MAAC ice hockey conference was dissolved due to Fairfield and Iona discontinuing their Division I programs. All remaining schools formed Atlantic Hockey which began play the following year.

All-Conference Teams
The all-conference teams are composed of one goaltender, two defencemen and three forwards. Should a tie occur for the final selection at any position, both players will be included as part of the superior team with no reduction in the number of players appearing on any succeeding teams (as happened in 1998–99 and 1999–00). Players may only appear once per year on any of the first or second teams but freshman may appear on both the rookie team and one of the other all-conference teams.

First Team

First Team All-Stars by school

Multiple Appearances

Second Team

Second Team All-Stars by school

Multiple Appearances

Rookie Team

Rookie Team All-Stars by school

Individual awards

See also
Atlantic Hockey Awards

References 

College ice hockey trophies and awards in the United States
Metro Atlantic Athletic Conference ice hockey